Priemerburg station is a railway station in the Primerburg district of the municipality of Güstrow, located in the Rostock district in Mecklenburg-Vorpommern, Germany.

Trivia
Priemerburg station is written in all documents by Deutsche Bahn in this form, although the corresponding district is officially called Primerburg.

References

Railway stations in Mecklenburg-Western Pomerania
Buildings and structures in Rostock (district)
Rostock S-Bahn stations